Bluffton Today is a daily newspaper in Bluffton, South Carolina that integrates many elements of citizen journalism into its tight local focus. Some industry analysts regard the newspaper as a possible future model for small newspapers across the country. The paper prints in a tabloid format, which is unusual for a paper of its circulation size.

Morris Communications started the newspaper in 2005 after the company folded the Carolina Morning News, a wraparound of the Savannah Morning News.

Bluffton Today originally was a free daily newspaper, but on Dec. 1, 2008, it began charging 25 cents per copy (75 cents on Sundays). The publisher said the newspaper had to start charging because of rising newsprint costs and declining advertising revenue.

In 2017, Morris sold its newspapers to GateHouse Media

References

External links

 Blufftontoday.com
 Read free the Bluffton Today (No issues available past 4/5/2011)

Newspapers published in South Carolina
Beaufort County, South Carolina
Morris Publishing Group
Publications established in 2005
Local mass media in the United States
2005 establishments in South Carolina